Tzur Natan (lit. Rock of Nathan) is a Moshav shitufi in central Israel. Located in western Samaria on a hilltop, 170 m above sea level, on a ridge in the foothills of the Samaritan Hills and to the south of Tayibe, it falls under the jurisdiction of Drom HaSharon Regional Council.

History
The moshav was founded in 1966 as a Nahal settlement by Hashomer Hatzair members, and was named after Nathan Simons. It was civilianised a year later by former members of the Beitar youth group.

In 2017, a minority of Tzur Natan families agreed to sell their land to a natural gas and diesel power station to be constructed by Edeltech only meters from the Arab Israeli city of Tira.

Archaeology
In 2019, a 5th-century mosaic with Greek inscription found at an ancient wine press. The inscription reads, “Only God help the beautiful property of Master Adios, amen.” Adios was a wealthy Samaritan landowner.

References

Moshavim
Nahal settlements
Populated places established in 1966
Populated places in Central District (Israel)
1966 establishments in Israel